Science and Technology Museum railway station is a railway station located in Sanmin District, Kaohsiung, Taiwan. It is located on the Pingtung line and is operated by Taiwan Railways. It is served by all local trains.

The station is located next to the National Science and Technology Museum, which is where the station gets its name. It will provide a connection to the Circular light rail when completed.

References

2018 establishments in Taiwan
Railway stations opened in 2018
Railway stations in Kaohsiung
Railway stations served by Taiwan Railways Administration